Raymond Shaban Mwakyusa (born 22 August 1993), better known by his stage name Rayvanny, is a Tanzanian musician, songwriter and recording artist who was signed under WCB Wasafi record label until July 2022. He is the most successful bongo flava musician in Tanzania from Mbeya region. He is the founder and CEO of Next Level Music. Rayvanny is best known by his song "Kwetu", which introduced him to the world. Rayvanny was mentioned by MTV Base among "Acts To Look Out For" in 2017.

Later on August 1, 2022, a Colombian version of his song, Mama Tetema he made collaborating with a Colombian musician, Maluma won him an award in EAEA People's Choice, Best Global Collaboration category on East Africa Arts Entertainment Awards (EAEA)

Career 
In 2011, when Rayvanny was still in high school, he realized his passion for music. He won a rap freestyle competition. In 2012 he joined a music group called Tip Top Connection, where he got more experience in his music career and connected with a lot of artists.

In 2015 he decided to officially join one of the biggest record labels, WCB Wasafi Records, which is managed and under the leadership of Diamond Platnumz. He released his first song, "Kwetu", in 2016. It became a hit in East Africa.

In 2016, Rayvanny was nominated for an MTV Africa Music Award in the category of Breakthrough Act 2016. In 2017 he was also nominated for several music awards, such as AEUSA for Best New Talent, Uganda Entertainment Award for Best African Act, and BET Award for International Viewers' Choice.

In 2021, Rayvanny founded his own record label, Next Level Music.

In November 2021, Rayvanny collaborates with Maluma on the title "Mama Tetema". "Mama Tetema" was certified Disco de Oro in 2022 by RIAA.

In July 2022, He left WCB to focus on his on Record Label, Next Level Music.

Rayvanny holds the record of being the first Tanzanian / African act to perform at the stage of MTV EMA, first Tanzanian act to clock 100 Million streams on Boomplay and the only Tanzanian artist to ever win a BET Award.

Discography

Awards and nominations

MTV Africa Music Awards

|-
|2016
|Himself
|Breakthrough Act
|

BET Awards 

|-
|2017
|Himself
|International Viewers' Choice Award
|

African Muzik Magazine Awards  

|-
|2017
|Himself
|Best Newcomer
|

Afrimma 

|-
|2022
|Himself
|Best Male East Africa
|

References

External links

 
 Rayvanny – MistariYetu

1993 births
Living people
People from Mbeya Region
Tanzanian musicians
Swahili-language singers
21st-century Tanzanian male singers
 Tanzanian Bongo Flava musicians